was a professional football club based in Matsue, which is located in Shimane Prefecture in Japan. They played in the Japan Football League, the Japanese fourth tier of football, until 2022.

History 
FC Kagura Shimane was founded as Matsue City FC on the basis of a precedent team, which already was playing in Chūgoku Soccer League, Vorador Matsue. In 2011, the new-born club started their new activities to join Japanese professional football as soon as they could. An NPO corporation was made to manage the club and push towards J. League, while winning twice the Chūgoku Soccer League.

They also featured eight times in the Emperor's Cup, getting past the 1st round in 2015, 2017, 2018, 2020.

The club withdrew from the JFL on 23 January 2023, just a few days after the league schedule was released. Unpaid wages and intern turmoil led to many players leaving the club, with the situation being made public by themselves. On 14 March 2023, after their parent company "Matsue City FC KK" was filed by bankruptcy, the club officially dissolved.

Changes in club name 

 Matsue City FC : 2011–2021
 FC Kagura Shimane : 2022

League & cup record 

Key

Honours 
Chūgoku Soccer League
 Champions (3): 2014, 2015, 2018

All Japan Senior Football Championship
 Winners (1): 2018

Regional Promotion Series
 Winners (1): 2018

Last team squad 
Updated to 17 September 2022.

Club Officials
For the 2022 season.

Managerial history

Kit evolution

Historical logos

References

External links 
Official Site 
Official Facebook Page
Official Twitter Account

Football clubs in Japan
Sport in Shimane Prefecture
Association football clubs established in 2011
2011 establishments in Japan
Japan Football League clubs